Slobodan Boškan (Serbian Cyrillic: Слободан Бошкан, born 18 August 1975) is former Serbian volleyball player, a member of Serbia men's national volleyball team, 2000 Olympic volleyball champion, medalist of European Championship and World League.

Career
In 2000, he was part of the Yugoslav team which won the gold medal in the Olympic tournament. He played one match.

References 
 

1975 births
Living people
Serbian men's volleyball players
Serbia and Montenegro men's volleyball players
Yugoslav men's volleyball players
Volleyball players at the 2000 Summer Olympics
Olympic volleyball players of Yugoslavia
Olympic gold medalists for Federal Republic of Yugoslavia
Olympic medalists in volleyball
European champions for Serbia and Montenegro
Olympiacos S.C. players
Olympiacos S.C. coaches
Iraklis V.C. players
Sportspeople from Novi Sad
Medalists at the 2000 Summer Olympics
Serbian expatriate sportspeople in Greece
Serbian expatriate sportspeople in Italy
Serbian expatriate sportspeople in France
Serbian expatriate sportspeople in Turkey
Serbian expatriate sportspeople in Montenegro
Tours Volley-Ball players